Artistic roller skating was introduced as a World Games sport at the 1981 World Games in Santa Clara, California.

Medalists

Men

Free Skating

Women

Free Skating

Mixed

Pairs

Dance

External links
 World Games at Sports123 by Internet Archive
 World Games 2013

 
Sports at the World Games
World Games
World Games